Jam Ab (also Romanized as Jam Āb and Jam‘āb; also known as Jam Āp) is a village in Golmakan Rural District, Golbajar District, Chenaran County, Razavi Khorasan Province, Iran. At the 2006 census, its population was 269, in 69 families.

References 

Populated places in Chenaran County